Hiro Ozawa (小澤 寛, born 18 May 1998) is a Japanese professional footballer who plays as a forward for WE League club JEF United Chiba Ladies.

Club career 
Ozawa made her WE League debut on 26 September 2021.

References 

Japanese women's footballers
WE League players
1998 births
Living people
Women's association football forwards
Association football people from Kanagawa Prefecture